= Bereketzade Ali Efendi Mosque =

Mosque in Istanbul, Turkey

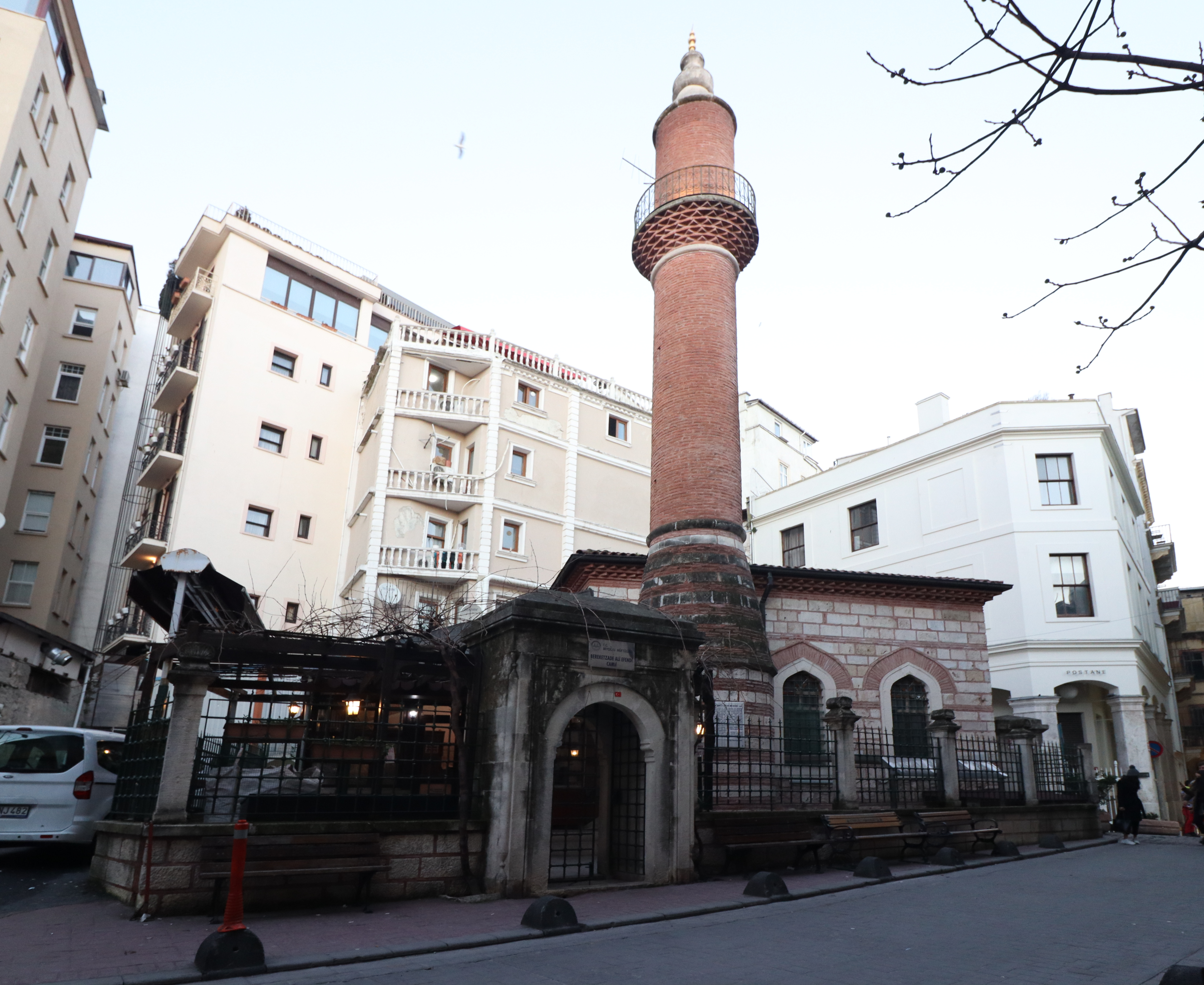
- The mosque in 2022

- Location within Turkey

Location
- Interactive map of Bereketzade Ali Efendi Mosque
- Coordinates: 41.02507498°N 28.97418708°E

Bereketzade Ali Efendi Mosque is a mosque in Istanbul, Turkey.
